Jim Dotson (born 1977/1978) is an American politician. He has represented part of Benton County, Arkansas in the Arkansas Senate since 2023. Previously, he represented a similar constituency in the Arkansas House of Representatives from 2013 to 2023.

Dotson was born in Bentonville, Arkansas, and attended Northwest Arkansas Community College. In 2013, he was elected for the 93rd district of the Arkansas House of Representatives, assuming office on January 14, 2013. In 2014, Dotson began working as a real estate agent at Gibson Real Estate.

In 2022 he was elected for the 34th district of the Arkansas Senate, defeating Peter Christie, mayor of Bella Vista, Arkansas, in the Republican primary, and Libertarian Jean Pierre DeVilliers in the general election.

References 

1970s births
Living people
People from Bentonville, Arkansas
Businesspeople from Arkansas
Republican Party members of the Arkansas House of Representatives
21st-century American politicians
Northwest Arkansas Community College alumni
American real estate brokers